Erblichia is a monotypic genus of flowering plants belonging to the family Passifloraceae. The only species is Erblichia odorata, common name Butterfly tree or Flor de Mayo. Originally the genera was composed of five species, however, these species are currently classified as heterotypic synonyms. Unlike other members of Turneroideae which exhibit distyly, E. odorata is a homostylous species.

Its native range is Mexico to Central America, it is found in the countries of; Belize, Costa Rica, El Salvador, Guatemala, Honduras, Mexico, Nicaragua and Panamá.

The genus name is in honour of Ch. Erblich, a German court garden-master in Hannover, it was first described and published in Bot. Voy. Herald on page 130 in 1854.

References

Passifloraceae
Monotypic Malpighiales genera
Plants described in 1854
Flora of South America